Grace Reformed Church may refer to:

United States
On the National Register of Historic Places
 Grace Reformed Church (Newton, North Carolina)
 Grace Reformed Church (Akron, Ohio)
 Grace Reformed Church (Washington, D.C.)